Lady Stanley may refer to:
Joan Stanley, Baroness Stanley, wife of Thomas Stanley, 1st Baron Stanley
any Baroness Stanley of Alderley, but most commonly to:
Maria Josepha Stanley, Baroness Stanley of Alderley (1766–1850), wife of John Stanley, 1st Baron Stanley of Alderley
Henrietta Stanley, Baroness Stanley of Alderley (1807–1895), campaigner for women's education and wife of Edward Stanley, 2nd Baron Stanley of Alderley
Constance Stanley, Baroness Stanley of Preston and later also Countess of Derby (1840–1922), wife of Frederick Stanley, 16th Earl of Derby, after whom the Lady Stanley Institute for Trained Nurses in Ottawa, Canada, is named
Dorothy Tennant (1855–1926), wife of explorer Sir Henry Morton Stanley
Margaret Beaufort, Countess of Richmond and Derby (1443–1509), mother of Henry VII of England; known as Lady Stanley during her marriage to Thomas Stanley, 1st Earl of Derby.